Pugwash  may refer to:

Places
 Pugwash, Nova Scotia, a village in Cumberland County (and site of the first Pugwash Conferences)
 Pugwash Junction, an unincorporated community bordering the village

Organizations
 Pugwash Conferences on Science and World Affairs, international scientific discussion group
 International Student/Young Pugwash, international student organization
 Student Pugwash USA, US student organization

Entertainment
 Pugwash (band), Irish pop band
 Captain Pugwash, children's animated cartoon series
 John Patrick "Pugwash" Weathers, Welsh rock drummer